The Finance Committee, until 2015 known as the Finance and Services Committee, is a select committee of the House of Commons in the Parliament of the United Kingdom. The committee considers expenditure on and the administration of services for the House of Commons, and it has responsibility for detailed scrutiny of the House’s budget.

Membership
As of February 2023, the members of the committee are as follows:

Source:

Changes since 2019

2017-2019 Parliament
Members were announced on 30 October 2017.

Changes 2017-2019

2015-2017 Parliament
Members were announced on 20 July 2015.

Changes 2015-2017

2010-2015 Parliament
Members were announced on 26 July 2010.

Changes 2010-2015

See also
List of Committees of the United Kingdom Parliament

References

External links
 Finance Committee
 Records for this Committee are held at the Parliamentary Archives

Select Committees of the British House of Commons